The 1993 All-Ireland Minor Football Championship was the 62nd staging of the All-Ireland Minor Football Championship, the Gaelic Athletic Association's premier inter-county Gaelic football tournament for boys under the age of 18.

Meath entered the championship as defending champions.

On 19 September 1993, Cork won the championship following a 2-7 to 0-9 defeat of Meath in the All-Ireland final. This was their 9th All-Ireland title overall and their first title in two championship seasons.

Results

Connacht Minor Football Championship

Quarter-Final

Semi-Finals

Finals

Leinster Minor Football Championship

Preliminary Round

Quarter-Finals

Semi-Finals

Final

Munster Minor Football Championship

Quarter-Finals

Semi-Finals

Final

Ulster Minor Football Championship

Preliminary Round

Quarter-Finals

Semi-Finals

Final

All-Ireland Minor Football Championship

Semi-Finals

Final

References

1993
All-Ireland Minor Football Championship